Brian Morris (born 18 October 1936) is emeritus professor of anthropology at Goldsmiths College at the University of London. He is a specialist on folk taxonomy, ethnobotany and ethnozoology, and on religion and symbolism. He has carried out fieldwork among South Asian hunter-gatherers and in Malawi. Groups that he has studied include the Ojibwa.

Books 
 Forest Traders: a Socio-economic Study of the Hill Pandaram (1982), Humanities Press
 Anthropological Studies of Religion (1987), Cambridge University Press, 
 Bakunin: The Philosophy of Freedom (1993), Black Rose Books, 
 Anthropology Of The Self: The Individual In Cultural Perspective (1994)
 The Power Of Animals (1998), Berg
 Western Conceptions of the Individual 1991, Berg, 
 Animals and Ancestors: An Ethnography (2000), Berg
 Insects and Human Life (2004), Berg, 
 Kropotkin: The Politics of Community (2004), 
 The History and Conservation of Mammals in Malawi (2004), Kachere Series (Zomba), 
 Religion And Anthropology: A Critical Introduction (2006), Cambridge University Press
 Ernest Thompson Seton, Founder of the Woodcraft Movement 1860-1946: Apostle of Indian Wisdom and Pioneer Ecologist (2007), Edwin Mellen Press (Lewiston), 
 The Anarchist Geographer: An Introduction to the Life of Peter Kropotkin (2012), Genge Press (Minehead)
 Pioneers of Ecological Humanism (2012), Book Guild Publishing (Brighton), 
 Anthropology, Ecology, and Anarchism: A Brian Morris Reader (2014), PM Press, 
 Pioneers of Ecological Humanism: Mumford, Dubos, and Bookchin (2017), Black Rose Books, 
 Visions of Freedom: Critical Writings on Ecology and Anarchism (2018), Black Rose Books, 
 Kropotkin: The Politics of Community (2018), PM Press, 
 Anthropology and Dialectical Naturalism: A Philosophical Manifesto (2020), Black Rose Books,

References

External links 
 

1936 births
Living people
British anarchists
British anthropologists
Anthropologists of religion
Academics of Goldsmiths, University of London